is a Japanese actor.

Sano is represented with Stardust Promotion's Section 3.

Biography
While he was in his third-year junior high school, Sano was scouted in Shibuya Station. He is a former member of Stardust Promotion's young actor dance unit Jamming Flow.

In March 2007, Sano appeared in the Tokyo Broadcasting System Ai no Gekijō Sand Chronicles as Daigo Kitamura in his middle school years, and later in July he appeared in the drama Katagoshi no Koibito on the same channel. In January 2008 he opened his official blog "Kaizō Keikaku" with Masataka Kubota. In 2010 Sano's first lead film role was Ongakubito.

Filmography

TV drama

Continuous

Guest appearances

Two hour drama

Films

Direct-to-video

Internet

Stage

Variety

Documentaries

Advertisements

Books

Music videos

References

External links
 

Stardust Promotion artists
Male actors from Kanagawa Prefecture
1989 births
Living people
21st-century Japanese male actors